The Medieval Mediterranean is a peer-reviewed history book series published by Brill on the medieval history of the Mediterranean area. The managing editor is Frances Andrews of St Andrews University. The series published approximately three books each year and had published 107 volumes as of November 2016.

See also
History of the Mediterranean region
Medieval World Series
Routledge Studies in Medieval Religion and Culture

References 

Series of history books
Brill Publishers books
History of the Mediterranean